Ranger 2 was a flight test of the Ranger spacecraft system of the NASA Ranger program designed for future lunar and interplanetary missions. Ranger 2 was designed to test various systems for future exploration and to conduct scientific observations of cosmic rays, magnetic fields, radiation, dust particles, and a possible hydrogen gas "tail" trailing the Earth.

Spacecraft design 

Ranger 2 was of the Ranger Block 1 design and was almost identical to Ranger 1. A high-gain directional dish antenna was attached to the bottom of the base. Spacecraft experiments and other equipment were mounted on the base and tower. Instruments aboard the spacecraft included a Lyman-alpha telescope, a rubidium-vapor magnetometer, electrostatic analyzers, medium-energy-range particle detectors, two triple coincidence telescopes, a cosmic-ray integrating ionization chamber, cosmic dust detectors, and scintillation counters.

The communications system included the high-gain antenna and an omnidirectional medium-gain antenna and two transmitters at approximately 960 MHz, one with 0.25 W power output and the other with 3 W power output. Power was to be furnished by 8680 solar cells on the two panels, a  silver-zinc battery, and smaller batteries on some of the experiments. Attitude control was provided by a solid state timing controller, Sun and Earth sensors, gyroscopes, and pitch and roll jets. The temperature was controlled passively by gold plating, white paint, and polished aluminum surfaces.

Mission 
Shortly after Ranger 1's unsuccessful mission, Atlas 117D and Agena 6002 were rolled out to LC-12 for the next attempt. Once again, getting the booster and spacecraft ready for flight proved a frustrating experience. On October 24, NASA received the news from the West Coast of the United States that a hydraulics failure had prevented Discoverer 33 from reaching orbit the previous day, which necessitated taking Agena 6002 down from the stack and giving it a thorough checkout. The stage was found to have the same problem as Discoverer 33's Agena, necessitating repair work. It took until mid-November before everything was finally ready. Liftoff took place at 3:12 AM EST on November 18. An improper autopilot signal resulted in Atlas BECO taking place 0.4 seconds early. Thus the sustainer phase of flight was initiated with below nominal velocity, but the vehicle reached orbit successfully since the guidance computer was programmed to not issue the SECO command until the proper velocity was achieved. The same malfunction had occurred on Atlas 105D/Midas 4 a month earlier and was traced to the location of the staging backup acceleration switch on the side of the LOX tank, causing the switch to be affected by the super-cold temperatures. The switch was moved to the fuel tank on subsequent Atlas-Agena vehicles.

When it came time for the second Agena restart, the result was once again a burn lasting a few seconds. This time, the problem was traced to a defective rate gyro in the Agena which had gone undetected at launch. The control system caused the stage to rotate uncontrollably with the result that the propellants were pushed to the outer edge of the tanks by centrifugal force and could not drain down into the fuel feed lines properly. Unlike with Ranger 1, the Agena had not operated long enough to achieve any significant ISP and so the probe was left in an even lower orbit. Tracking antennas could not lock onto the probe or send it any commands, nor could the attitude control system stabilize it. Telemetry and instrument data were still received for a few hours, but eventually the orbit decayed too low and after only one day and 19 orbits, Ranger 2 reentered the atmosphere and burned up.

See also

 Ranger program
 Timeline of Solar System exploration
 List of artificial objects on the Moon

Footnotes

References

External links
Space Flight Operations Memorandum - Ranger 2 (Post-flight Mission Analysis)
Lunar impact: A history of Project Ranger (PDF) 1977

2
Spacecraft launched in 1961
Spacecraft which reentered in 1961